Core International, Inc., commonly referred to as Core, was a multinational computer and technology corporation headquartered in Boca Raton, Florida, United States.

The company is now part of Sony and no longer exists as stand-alone identity. The company was founded in 1979 by Hal Prewitt as a technology firm to develop, market and support computer related products and services. They were best known for supporting IBM's first business microcomputers such as the 5100, 5110 and 5120. With the introduction of the IBM PC and PC AT, the company provided an extensive line of disk drives, backup and personal computer products. Core became very well known as a leading industry developer of disk array and computer data storage.

Many of Core's products were the first of their kind, had no direct competition and were widely regarded for their superior performance and reliability. Users and the computer press raved about Core's products. InfoWorld described Core's ATplus "is built like a Sherman tank, offering exceptional performance and reliability." PC Magazine called them "Workhorses of Performance Computing" and "High-quality construction..breaks the speed barrier for access times" and asked "Will other manufactures follow suit?"

Core was known for their advertising and perhaps produced a few of the PC Industry's greatest promotions. The 1985 and 1986 rebate and recall Ad for IBM PC AT hard disk drives. So successful and controversial, there was a rumor it was a topic at an IBM board of directors meeting. And the time where they gave away a free IBM PC AT when purchasing one of Core's ATplus 72 MB drives.

Core remained a private company solely owned by Prewitt until 1993 when purchased by Aiwa, which was a wholly owned subsidiary of Sony.

History
For business history pre-incorporation

1975–1980: Founding

The company was built on the early work of Prewitt using his business and personal computer development experiences. This was the period during the creation of the first microcomputers, the launch of the Altair 8800 and founding of Microsoft. He was selling and programming Minicomputers and assembling these microcomputers, attaching computer peripherals, programming and building them into business computer systems.

Core was created under a different business model. Initially, it was marketed as an association and structured as a for-profit organization specifically for users of the IBM 5100 Series and IBM System/23. The objective was to sell by mail-order computer supplies, pre-developed (off-the-shelf) programs and hardware maintenance service. Supplies included printer ribbons and paper, diskettes, tape cartridges. Software ranged from simple mortgage interest calculations, word processing, games and utilities to advanced payroll, accounting and industry specific applications. Users wanted readily available, simple to install and support for software that was also low in cost. Core was able to fill this niche because IBM had developed the machines with engineering and scientific applications in mind, while business programs such as construction, agriculture, and manufacturing were not generally available. Computer maintenance was an insurance program that provided on-site repairs and replacement parts, all provided by IBM service but at a lower cost than available directly from IBM.

The company was very successful attracting users of the IBM 5100 Series as many IBM Sales Representatives referred their customers to the organization. While Core grew, profits were used for the continuing development of computer data storage.

1981–1983: Hard disk drives, LAN and PC for IBM 5100 series
These IBM machines had a closed architecture, with most of the design information unpublished and held secret.  Computer systems of this design are extremely or most likely impossible to have the ability to swap components, obtain support from other vendors or upgrade to better configuration/another model unless that option is available from the original manufacturer. The limitations make a customer dependent on one vendor for products and services for the software and hardware parts of the system.

Core sensed an opportunity to provide greater and faster computer data storage. After a five-year effort, in September 1982 they announced the availability of the first hard disk drives and local area network (LAN) for the IBM 5100 Series. IBM systems as sold were storage limited and without a network option; the 5100 had tape with the 5110 and 5120 restricted to 1.2 MB floppy disks. Core drives were available starting at 10 MB and increased up to 160 MB in removable and fixed configurations.

CoreNet, the LAN built into each Core storage system, allowed interconnection of up to eight IBM 5100 Series systems, providing the ability to share storage and data. This configuration pre-dated LANs of the period for the IBM PC and compatibles.

In 1983, Core introduced two major solutions as IBM was withdrawing from marketing the IBM 5100 series. First, software called PC51 that would run allowed 5100 series computer programs written in BASIC to run unmodified on the IBM PC and compatibles under MS-DOS. And second, a LAN card for the IBM PC and compatibles that provided connection to the IBM 5100 Series network. These solutions allowed IBM 5110/5120 series users to add new technology and increase productivity while retaining their investment in equipment and software.

Core's development of their storage systems, LAN and PC51 software was major technology engineering feat without rivals. Due to the complexity and the successful reverse engineering of the systems, resulted in captive market as they were the only organization able to provide an upgrade path for these IBM owners.

1984–1986: Educating the marketplace, IBM VAD, hard disk drives, PC and backup
In 1984, CORE expanded its product focus and entered the personal computer (PC) marketplace. The company's first product introduced the year before, called PC-51, was a completely new operating system (and language) for the IBM PC and compatibles. It enabled a PC to function like an IBM 5110/5120 system, demonstrating the company's strong software development capabilities. Not only did this allow users to continue using the application software they had already developed, but it increased processing speed by a factor of two to ten times, and reduced maintenance cost up to 90%.

This new product opened up an unexplored marketplace for CORE by allowing the company to become an IBM value-added dealer (VAD) and sell both the IBM PC and CORE products individually and as a combined package. IBM authorized and promoted this relationship because it provided an upgrade path for their customers that was previously unavailable. As a result of the early development effort for the IBM 5100 series, CORE released its own family of high-performance hard disk drives called the ATplus Series, with better capacity, reliability and performance than IBM's drives.

A few weeks after the introduction of the new IBM AT in August 1984, CORE discovered problems in the factory-issued hard disk drive. As the media and marketplace learned of IBM's disk problems, CORE was once again in a unique position to capitalize on an opportunity, without any significant competition. For more than six months the IBM AT the model with the CMI was in short supply. Delays were attributed to lack of drives, technical problems with the machine or some other undisclosed issues.

Core desired a major partner and selected Control Data Corporation (CDC) to assist with the introduction of the drives for the PC marketplace. The announcement was made in February 1985 and generated a significant amount of press coverage.

Core discovered that a general lack of understanding existed among the news media and users regarding technology of different computer and mass storage systems. Few understood the value of different systems to the end-user or how to rate the many choices in the marketplace. In response, Core began placing considerable emphasis on user education, which resulted in a major contribution to computer industry. Directly from these efforts, the news media, computer magazines, product reviewers, dealers and computer manufactures started discussing, providing and promoting "seek time", "access time", "transfer time" and how to value or understand hard disk drives importance in a computer system. The company believed the more end-users learned about computers and the engineering behind Core products, the less these users wanted any other product.

Purchasers of the IBM AT were reporting some dealers were installing inferior drives into the computer without disclosing the fact. To help buyers and for industry education, Core developed the DiskP program, later replaced by the COREtest (DOS based), to identify sub-standard products by providing a visual demonstration of the speed and comparative measurements of hard disk drives and controllers. Many computer publications, hardware manufacturers, distributors, dealers and independent evaluation firms relied on COREtest for product comparison, which made COREtest the industry standard and most often quoted benchmark. As these programs were provide without charge and freely available from BBS, computer magazines and dealers, it is believed there was an installed base of over million copies worldwide promoting Core technology and education.

For more than two years, newspapers, magazines and computer publications ran stories on the IBM AT and Computer Memories Inc. (CMI) hard disk drives problems.

References

External links

 Sony official website

Defunct computer companies of the United States
Defunct computer hardware companies
Defunct software companies of the United States
Computer storage companies
Backup software
Hard disk drives
Portable hard drives
RAID
Software companies based in Florida
Companies based in Boca Raton, Florida
American companies established in 1979
Computer companies established in 1979
Software companies established in 1979
American companies disestablished in 1993
Computer companies disestablished in 1993
Software companies disestablished in 1993
1979 establishments in Florida
1993 disestablishments in Florida
Defunct manufacturing companies based in Florida